Hachimanmae Station may refer to:
 Hachimanmae Station (Kyoto), a railway station in Kyoto, Japan
 Hachimanmae Station (Wakayama), a railway station in Wakayama, Japan